Morawetz is a Germanized variant of the Czech surname Moravec. It may refer to:

 Cathleen Synge Morawetz (1923–2017), Canadian mathematician
 Geoffrey B. Morawetz, Canadian judge
 Herbert Morawetz (1915–2007), American chemical engineer
 Oskar Morawetz (1917–2007), Czech-Canadian composer
 Wilfried Morawetz (1951–2007), Austrian botanist

See also
 
 Moravčík
 Morávek
 Moravek
 Morawitz

Surnames of Czech origin
Slavic-language surnames